The 2017–18 Phoenix Fuel Masters season was the third season of the franchise in the Philippine Basketball Association (PBA).

Key dates

2017
October 29: The 2017 PBA draft took place in Midtown Atrium, Robinson Place Manila.

Draft picks

Roster

Philippine Cup

Eliminations

Standings

Game log

|- style="background:#fcc;"
| 1
| December 17
| San Miguel
| L 96–104
| Jeff Chan (18)
| Doug Kramer (10)
| Chan, Wright (4)
| Smart Araneta Coliseum5,600
| 0–1
|- style="background:#bfb;"
| 2
| December 27
| Kia
| W 125–102
| three players (15)
| Kramer, Perkins (9)
| Jason Perkins (6)
| Ynares Center
| 1–1

|- style="background:#bfb;"
| 3
| January 7
| NLEX
| W 102–95
| Matthew Wright (19)
| Doug Kramer (11)
| Matthew Wright (7)
| Smart Araneta Coliseum9,000
| 2–1
|- style="background:#fcc;"
| 4
| January 17
| Rain or Shine
| L 99–120
| Perkins, Wright (17)
| Matthew Wright (7)
| LA Revilla (5)
| Smart Araneta Coliseum
| 2–2
|- style="background:#fcc;"
| 5
| January 20
| Magnolia
| L 91–97
| Gelo Alolino (19)
| four players (6)
| LA Revilla (5)
| Cuneta Astrodome
| 2–3
|- style="background:#bfb;"
| 6
| January 26
| Barangay Ginebra
| W 87–82
| three players (19)
| LA Revilla (11)
| Chan, Revilla (6)
| Smart Araneta Coliseum
| 3–3
|- style="background:#fcc;"
| 7
| January 31
| Alaska
| L 75–93
| Matthew Wright (16)
| Matthew Wright (11)
| Revilla, Wright (5)
| Mall of Asia Arena
| 3–4

|- style="background:#bfb;"
| 8
| February 7
| TNT
| W 74–72
| Matthew Wright (16)
| Jason Perkins (10)
| Jeff Chan (6)
| Mall of Asia Arena
| 4–4
|- style="background:#fcc;"
| 9
| February 14
| Meralco
| L 90–92
| Willy Wilson (24)
| Wilson, Wright (8)
| Jeff Chan (3)
| Smart Araneta Coliseum
| 4–5
|- style="background:#fcc;"
| 10
| February 21
| Blackwater
| L 78–83
| Jason Perkins (17)
| Doug Kramer (13)
| Jeff Chan (8)
| Smart Araneta Coliseum
| 4–6

|- style="background:#bfb;"
| 11
| March 2
| GlobalPort
| W 104–100
| Matthew Wright (32)
| Jason Perkins (10)
| RJ Jazul (7)
| Smart Araneta Coliseum
| 5–6

Playoffs

Bracket

Game log

|- style="background:#fcc;"
| 1
| March 4
| TNT
| L 97–118
| Matthew Wright (18)
| Kramer, Perkins (11)
| Matthew Wright (6)
| Smart Araneta Coliseum
| 0–1

Commissioner's Cup

Eliminations

Standings

Game log

|- style="background:#bfb;"
| 1
| April 25
| Blackwater
| W 107–102
| James White (31)
| James White (14)
| Matthew Wright (8)
| Smart Araneta Coliseum
| 1–0
|- style="background:#fcc;"
| 2
| April 28
| TNT
| L 98–106
| James White (32)
| James White (11)
| Matthew Wright (7)
| Ynares Center
| 1–1

|- style="background:#bfb;"
| 3
| May 6
| Magnolia
| W 89–87
| White, Wright (19)
| James White (17)
| Matthew Wright (8)
| Mall of Asia Arena
| 2–1
|- style="background:#fcc;"
| 4
| May 11
| NLEX
| L 115–120 (OT)
| Matthew Wright (31)
| Kramer, Perkins (12)
| Jeff Chan (8)
| Alonte Sports Arena
| 2–2
|- style="background:#bfb;"
| 5
| May 20
| Barangay Ginebra
| W 103–98 (2OT)
| Eugene Phelps (25)
| Eugene Phelps (14)
| Eugene Phelps (7)
| Smart Araneta Coliseum
| 3–2
|- align="center"
|colspan="9" bgcolor="#bbcaff"|All-Star Break
|- style="background:#fcc;"
| 6
| May 30
| San Miguel
| L 94–106
| Eugene Phelps (33)
| Eugene Phelps (17)
| Jeff Chan (9)
| Smart Araneta Coliseum
| 3–3

|- style="background:#fcc;"
| 7
| June 8
| Meralco
| L 100–103 (OT)
| Eugene Phelps (31)
| Eugene Phelps (26)
| Matthew Wright (6)
| Smart Araneta Coliseum
| 3–4
|- style="background:#fcc;"
| 8
| June 10
| Columbian
| L 107–115
| Eugene Phelps (34)
| Eugene Phelps (22)
| LA Revilla (7)
| Smart Araneta Coliseum
| 3–5
|- style="background:#fcc;"
| 9
| June 16
| Rain or Shine
| L 106–108
| Chan, Phelps (26)
| Eugene Phelps (14)
| Eugene Phelps (7)
| Smart Araneta Coliseum
| 3–6
|- style="background:#bfb;"
| 10
| June 20
| GlobalPort
| W 135–108
| Eugene Phelps (37)
| Eugene Phelps (23)
| Eugene Phelps (10)
| Smart Araneta Coliseum
| 4–6

|- style="background:#fcc;"
| 11
| July 6
| Alaska
| L 91–114
| Eugene Phelps (23)
| Eugene Phelps (10)
| Phelps, Revilla (5)
| Cuneta Astrodome
| 4–7

Governors' Cup

Eliminations

Standings

Game log

|- style="background:#bfb;"
| 1
| August 22
| Columbian
| W 113–107
| Eugene Phelps (50)
| Eugene Phelps (17)
| Matthew Wright (6)
| Smart Araneta Coliseum
| 1–0
|- style="background:#bfb;"
| 2
| August 26
| NorthPort
| W 132–91
| Eugene Phelps (30)
| Eugene Phelps (15)
| LA Revilla (11)
| Smart Araneta Coliseum
| 2–0
|- style="background:#fcc;"
| 3
| August 29
| Alaska
| L 97–108
| Eugene Phelps (27)
| Eugene Phelps (24)
| Matthew Wright (6)
| Smart Araneta Coliseum
| 2–1
|- style="background:#bfb;"
| 4
| August 31
| TNT
| W 112–82
| Jason Perkins (22)
| Calvin Abueva (13)
| Revilla, Wright (6)
| Smart Araneta Coliseum
| 3–1

|- style="background:#bfb;"
| 5
| September 19
| Meralco
| W 96–86
| Eugene Phelps (24)
| Eugene Phelps (19)
| Matthew Wright (5)
| Smart Araneta Coliseum
| 4–1
|- style="background:#bfb;"
| 6
| September 23
| Magnolia
| W 95–82
| Eugene Phelps (36)
| Eugene Phelps (20)
| Calvin Abueva (5)
| Smart Araneta Coliseum
| 5–1
|- style="background:#fcc;"
| 7
| September 29
| Barangay Ginebra
| L 99–101
| Matthew Wright (27)
| Eugene Phelps (13)
| LA Revilla (5)
| Xavier University Gym
| 5–2

|- style="background:#bfb;"
| 8
| October 10
| NLEX
| W 123–97
| Eugene Phelps (51)
| Eugene Phelps (20)
| Matthew Wright (7)
| Cuneta Astrodome
| 6–2
|- style="background:#fcc;"
| 9
| October 12
| San Miguel
| L 100–117
| Eugene Phelps (37)
| Eugene Phelps (26)
| Eugene Phelps (6)
| Mall of Asia Arena
| 6–3
|- style="background:#bfb;"
| 10
| October 24
| Rain or Shine
| W 103–97
| Abueva, Phelps (18)
| Eugene Phelps (20)
| Eugene Phelps (7)
| Cuneta Astrodome
| 7–3

|- style="background:#bfb;"
| 11
| November 4 
| Blackwater
| W 97–91
| Calvin Abueva (25)
| Eugene Phelps (19)
| LA Revilla (6)
| Smart Araneta Coliseum
| 8–3

Playoffs

Bracket

Game log

|- style="background:#fcc;"
| 1
| November 7
| Meralco
| L 74–90
| Eugene Phelps (27)
| Eugene Phelps (17)
| Jazul, Revilla (3)
| Cuneta Astrodome
| 0–1
|- style="background:#fcc;"
| 2
| November 9
| Meralco
| L 103–108 (OT)
| Jason Perkins (24)
| Eugene Phelps (23)
| Eugene Phelps (7)
| Smart Araneta Coliseum
| 0–2

Transactions

Free agent signings

Trades

Preseason

Commissioner's Cup

Governor's Cup

Recruited imports

Awards

References

Phoenix Super LPG Fuel Masters seasons
Phoenix